{{Speciesbox
| image = 
| status = LC
| status_system = IUCN3.1
| status_ref = <ref name="iucn status 11 November 2021">{{cite iucn |authors= Aguayo, R., Aparicio, J., Embert, D., Gonzales, L., Muñoz, A. & Colli, G.R. |date=2019 |title='Tropidurus callathelys |volume=2019|page= e.T49845520A49845522|url=https://www.iucnredlist.org/species/49845520/49845522 |access-date=16 December 2021}}</ref> 
| genus = Tropidurus
| species = callathelys
| authority = Harvey & Gutberlet, 1998
}}Tropidurus callathelys'' is a species of lizard of the Tropiduridae family. It is found in Bolivia and Brazil.

References

Tropidurus
Reptiles described in 1998
Reptiles of Bolivia
Reptiles of Brazil